Francesco Pittaluga (11 October 1913 – 10 February 2016) was an Italian rower. He competed in the men's coxless four at the 1936 Summer Olympics.

References

External links
 

1913 births
2016 deaths
Italian centenarians
Italian male rowers
Olympic rowers of Italy
Rowers at the 1936 Summer Olympics
Sportspeople from Genoa